In the context of clothing, a wrap can refer to a shawl or stole or other fabric wrapped about the upper body, or a simple skirt-type garment made by wrapping a piece of material round the lower body. Many people of all genders throughout the world wear wraps in everyday life, although in the West they are largely worn by women. They are sometimes sewn at the edges to form a tube  which keeps the required size. A wrap may be secured by a corner being tucked beneath the wrapped material, by making a knot, or using ties, buttons or velcro. 

Types of wrap garments include:
 Antriya
 Adivasah
 Uttariya
 Veshti
 Kilt
 Cape, Cloak
 Longyi
 Mundu a garment worn in Kerala, the Tulunadu region, and Maldives.
 Mathabana
 Stanapatta
 Obi (sash)
 Sash
 Palla (garment)
 Pallium (Roman cloak), Toga, Himation, Chiton (costume)
 Pareo — any piece of cloth wrapped around the body, worn by males or females, especially in the Cook Islands and Tahiti. 
 Belted plaid
 Sarong and baju kebaya — length of fabric wrapped around the waist and worn by men and women throughout much of South Asia, Southeast Asia, the Arabian Peninsula, the Horn of Africa, and on many Pacific islands. 
 Sari
 Ta'ovala — a Tongan dress, a mat wrapped around the waist, worn by men and women, at all formal occasions.

Modern examples 
 Beach wraps - in the west, sarongs and towels are sometimes worn as wraps at the beach.
 Wrap skirts - skirts made in the design or style of a wrap.
 Wraps are sometimes worn for doing Yoga.
 Weather wraps, wraps designed to be water- and wind-proof.

See also
 Wrap dress
 Wrap with Love (blankets as clothing)

References

Skirts